Edward Jaku  (born Abraham Salomon Jakubowicz; 14 April 1920 – 12 October 2021) was a survivor of several German concentration camps during World War II, who wrote of his wartime experiences after emigrating to Australia. This memoir is called The Happiest Man on Earth and was published when he was 100 years old. It became an immediate best seller. Eddie had a sister Johanna (Henni) who also survived the Holocaust, and he changed his name to Edward (Eddie) as a tribute to his sister, who called him Eddie as an affectionate nickname.

Biography 
Jaku recounts that as a boy in Leipzig, Germany, he truly believed that he was part of "the most enlightened, the most cultured, the most sophisticated society in the whole world". His outlook changed following the rise of Nazis, when he was initially expelled from his school for being Jewish. His father organised an alias for him with false ID papers, and he was sent to an engineering college far away from Leipzig for his own safety. One night in 1938, he came back to visit for his parents' wedding anniversary only to find the house deserted. It was the night of the antisemitic pogrom, Kristallnacht, and he was taken from his bed by stormtroopers and sent to a concentration camp in Buchenwald. Here a former classmate recognised him and recommended him to the camp's leaders as a skilled tool maker. He was released to go and work in a factory, but his father managed to intercept him and they escaped as refugees to Belgium. 

Eddie was eventually recaptured several times and, along with his parents and sister, ended up in Auschwitz, where his parents were immediately sent to the gas chambers. His skill as an engineer made him valuable to the Nazi regime and his life was spared. Most of his extended family perished during the war, although his sister Henni survived. 

After the war, he returned to Belgium, where he met and married another Jewish survivor, Flore Molho, with whom he had two sons, Michael and Andre. He vowed that he would now "walk from German soil and never come back to the land that had given me everything and taken everything away from me." In 1950 he emigrated to Australia with his wife and first child, Michael. His second child, Andre, was born in Australia. 

Jaku served as a volunteer at the Sydney Jewish Museum from November 1992 until its closure due to COVID-19 in March 2020. He gave visitors a first-hand account of surviving the Holocaust. He gave a lecture in 2019 about his life experience during a TEDX Conference in Sydney.

An extensive biography was written by the BBC.

Death 
Jaku died in Sydney on 12 October 2021, aged 101.

Honours

References

External links 

 The Happiest Man on Earth: 99 year old Holocaust survivor shares his story

1920 births
2021 deaths
Holocaust survivors
Jewish German writers
Jewish Australian writers
Australian centenarians
Men centenarians
21st-century Australian writers
Australian anti-war activists
German emigrants to Australia
Recipients of the Medal of the Order of Australia
Engineers from Leipzig
Writers from Leipzig
German Ashkenazi Jews
Escapees from Auschwitz
Jewish escapees from Nazi concentration camps